The Ferrymead Railway is a New Zealand heritage railway built upon the track formation of New Zealand's first public railway, from Ferrymead to Christchurch, which opened on 1 December 1863. On the opening of the line to Lyttelton on 9 December 1867, the Ferrymead Railway became the Ferrymead Branch and was closed shortly thereafter. In 1964, rail enthusiasts began relaying track on the historic formation and the new  narrow gauge. Ferrymead Railway officially reopened in 1977. It now operates steam, diesel and electric trains regularly and is recognised as one of the most significant rail preservation sites in New Zealand.

Early history

The original line was built with the same  gauge as the Canterbury Provincial Railways to suit rolling stock imported from the Melbourne and Essendon Railway Company in the Australian state of Victoria. It serviced ships which docked at the Ferrymead wharf. Construction of the tunnel to the port of Lyttelton was in progress: when this was finished in 1867, the line to Ferrymead became a branch and thereafter carried little traffic.  After 27 July 1868, the line was used as a siding, by which time the station buildings had been relocated to Christchurch and Heathcote station.  It was the first railway in New Zealand to be both opened and closed.

The Museum of Science and Industry, as it was then called, began in Christchurch in the early 1960s when a group of like-minded individuals banded together to set up a pilot project at Garvins Road in Hornby. At that time the Canterbury Branch of the NZRLS applied to the New Zealand Railways Department to lease part of the old Southbridge Branch at Prebbleton. When this was turned down, Ferrymead became a serious possibility. The Museum of Science and Industry and the Canterbury Branch decided that the Ferrymead site was ideal. The centenary of the original line was commemorated in 1963 and the beginnings of the present Ferrymead Railway date to November 1964.

Ferrymead Heritage Park
It was decided that the site, later named Ferrymead Heritage Park, should include both railway and tram tracks, the latter operated by the Tramway Historical Society linking the entrance with a historical village development. The Canterbury Branch started construction of the Ferrymead Railway with infrastructure and facilities including the workshop, engine shed, stations, signalling systems and other facilities. The railway began to operate trains during 1972 and was officially opened in 1977. Up to that time, locomotives and rolling stock were transported to the site by truck. In 1978, the track was extended to a temporary connection with the New Zealand Railways main line near Heathcote, and this permitted the largest locomotives, the Vulcan railcars and other rolling stock to enter the site. The arrival of the Vulcans, the first real example of economical diesel motive power, allowed Saturday services and steam substitution to become a reality.

During the late 1970s, construction began on the electrified section of the railway, using materials and equipment obtained from the former electric lines between Christchurch and Lyttelton, and Arthur's Pass and Otira. Following the withdrawal of the DG class diesel-electric locomotives by NZR in 1983, a separate society, the Diesel Traction Group, was formed to preserve one of the class at Ferrymead and subsequently purchased DE class and DI class locomotives. In 1988, the Ferrymead Railway was an integral and key part of the Ferrymead 125 anniversary celebrations, which saw passenger train shuttles between Christchurch and Ferrymead via a main-line connection, returning via Lyttelton. Locomotives and rolling stock left Ferrymead by rail to participate in other parts of the rail festival, including several main-line excursions. In 1988, a DM class electric multiple unit (English Electric EMU) set comprising motor coach DM 320 and trailer D 2695 arrived at Ferrymead before the Ferrymead 125 celebrations, but did not attend the actual celebrations.

In 1990, there was another steam festival in conjunction with the New Zealand sesquicentennial, and a Vulcan Railcar tour of the South Island using RM 51 and RM 56. Also in that year, the NZRLS Canterbury Branch was reconstituted as the Canterbury Railway Society. Restructuring of New Zealand Railways, which had begun in the early 1980s, resulted in the closure of local railway facilities and produced further opportunities for CRS to acquire additional equipment. Changes in employment law and its consequent effect on New Zealand society after 1990 had major impacts on nearly every railway preservation organisation in New Zealand in terms of voluntary labour supply. The economic recession of 1991 also had its effect upon CRS. Ferrymead Heritage Park was also in financial trouble as a result of the economic downturn and a drop off in Park visitors. This era ushered in a number of changes for rail preservation groups including the introduction of new safety systems under the Land Transport Safety Authority.

Present day
In 1995, Ferrymead Historic Park was taken over by the Christchurch City Council when its financial losses became unsustainable. Since that time, there have been a number of changes in the way that the Park is run, with a greater reliance on voluntary labour. The Ferrymead Railway now operates a more limited running season to take into account the reduction in visitor numbers during the winter months and to allow for track and rolling stock maintenance as required. A feature of recent years has been the Waipara Vintage Festivals held every second year from 1995. Ferrymead Railway and Diesel Traction Group locomotives and carriages have participated in each of these steam-based festivals, held on the Weka Pass Railway, except for the 2003 event.

In 2005, plans for a National Rail Museum were revealed. Construction of the first stage will cost approximately $3.5 million. Other plans include the electrification between Moorhouse and Ferrymead stations which was completed in 2009, and extending the line from Moorhouse to a new Valley Station.

The earthquakes of September 2010 and February 2011 caused significant damage to infrastructure around the museum including the railway. Repairs were undertaken to get the railway up and running after authorities gave it the all-clear to operate again. The railway was operating at capacity by Easter 2012. This was seen as an achievement for the city of Christchurch and a morale-boosting event after a year of devastation.

Notes

References

External links

 Ferrymead Railway website
 Railways of Ferrymead website

Rail transport in Christchurch
Heritage railways in New Zealand
Ferrymead Heritage Park
3 ft 6 in gauge railways in New Zealand